The CAFA U-17 Women's Championship was the first edition of the CAFA U-17 Women's Championship, the international youth football championship organised by Central Asian Football Association for the women's under-17 national teams of Central Asia. Tajikistan hosted the tournament. A total of four teams including host Tajikistan played in the tournament. Players born on or after 1 January 2004 were eligible to participate.

Uzbekistan won the title to become the first CAFA U-17 Women's Championship champion. Iran Came Second after they defeated Host Tajikistan three to nil.

Participating nations
A total of 4 (out of 6) CAFA member national teams entered the tournament.

despite confirming their participation earlier, the Kyrgyz Republic withdrew before the tournament, citing unforeseen circumstances.

Did not enter

Venues
Matches were held at the Republican Central Stadium.

Match officials
Referees

  Maedeh Jaefari
  Veronika Bernatskaya
  Zuhal Khujanazarova
  Kristina Borisova

Assistant referees

  Farahnaz Jalali
  Sonia Noorri
  Atena Lashani
  Adinay Kylychbek Kyzy
  Dilshoda Rahmonova
  Zilola Rakhmatova

Main tournament 
The main tournament schedule was announced on 2 July 2021.

Player awards
The following awards were given at the conclusion of the tournament:

Goalscorers

References

External links

Sport in Dushanbe

2021 CAFA U-17 Women's Championship
2021 in Tajikistani football
2021 in women's association football
2021 in youth association football
Women's football in Tajikistan